Ramakrishnan Ramanathan popularly known as Ramu Ramanathan is an Indian playwright-director with acclaimed plays to his credit. His list of plays includes Cotton 56, Polyester 84; Jazz; Comrade Kumbhakarna; and more recently, Postcards From Bardoli. His book 3, Sakina Manzil And Other Plays, is a collection of eight plays, published by Orient Blackswan in collaboration with the English and Foreign Languages University (EFLU).

Ramu was editor of PT Notes, a monthly theatre newsletter produced by Prithvi Theatre in Mumbai for ten years. He also co-edited e-STQ (Seagull Theatre Quarterly), and has written columns on theatre for national dailies.

In addition to being counted as one of the best playwrights of today's India, Ramu is also the editor of PrintWeek India and Campaign India magazines He has been associated with the printing industry for 30 years. Ramu helped launch PrintWeek India in May 2008. He has been a driving force in reshaping coverage of the Indian print market through industry specials, awards and survey reports. Under his leadership, PrintWeek has grown into one of the largest teams covering print in India.

Ramu lives and works in Mumbai — the city where many of his plays are situated. Commenting on his relationship with Mumbai in a detailed interview with the Mumbai Theatre Guide, he says, "Mumbai is my lover. I love her and at the same time, I loathe her. To-date, even today, I discover something new in her. And that I’ve poured into the plays." As part of his research on the city and its culture, Ramu has catalogued an exhaustive reading list in form of Literature that Celebrates Mumbai: A List.

Early life 

Ramu was born on 29 December 1967 in Kolkata and later moved to Mumbai. He completed his schooling from St. Stanislaus High School, Mumbai. In 1988, Ramu graduated from University of Mumbai with bachelor's degree in Chemistry, and then completed Diploma in Journalism from Bharatiya Vidya Bhavan, Mumbai in 1990.

Publications 

 3 Sakina Manzil and Other Plays (in English), Orient Blackswan (2012) - An anthology of eight plays: Shanti, Shanti It’s A War; The Boy Who Stopped Smiling; Curfew; Mahadevbhai (1892–1942); Collaborators; 3, Sakina Manzil; Shakespeare And She; Jazz. 
 Mahadevbhai (in Marathi), Popular Prakashan (2011)
 Tathasthu ("So Be It"), in The Little Magazine (2010)
 Collaborators And Mahadevbhai, Sahitya Akademi (2006)
 Combat, published by National School of Drama (2003)

Theatre experience 

The playwright–director's best work is with young people and non-theatre persons. He staged Vaikom Mohammed Basheer’s Me Grandad ‘Ad An Elephant, and later Marguerite Duras’ L’amante Anglaise (both with university students) and Samuel Beckett's Krapp's Last Tape (with Little Prithvi Players). These were unsullied theatrical experiences.

Similarly, his collaboration with a group of architecture students resulted in three plays and one delightfully wicked piece calledPM @ 3 pm. This group hosted an important 7-day workshops on Set Design + Theatre Aesthetics and fabricated four model sets of King Lear, for four language theatres’ directors in Mumbai. He has conducted innumerable workshops and lectures, in which he has tried to reinstate the ideals of good taste, decent humour, intelligence and above all progressive values.

Playwriting

Theatrical adaptations

Direction

References

External links

1967 births
Indian male dramatists and playwrights
English-language writers from India
Writers from Mumbai
Living people